Ctenopterella is a genus of ferns in the family Polypodiaceae, subfamily Grammitidoideae, according to the Pteridophyte Phylogeny Group classification of 2016 (PPG I). It is known from Africa through southeast Asia and Oceania to Polynesia.

Description
The rhizomes are dorsiventral (having upper and lower surfaces clearly distinct in appearance), and bear two rows of stipes, which sometimes have distinct joints where they attach. Distinct phyllopodia are present in some below the joint. The rhizome scales are brown, glabrous, and dull to glossy.

Hairs, where present, are unbranched and branched, from whitish to brown in color. The leaf blades range from pinnatifid to pinnate-pinnatifid in cutting, bearing free veins which usually end in hydathodes on the upper surface of the leaf. Sori are borne beneath pinnae or lobes, sometimes slightly sunken into the leaf tissue, usually in two rows but rarely in one. The sori are circular to elliptic in shape; the sporangia lack hairs.

Taxonomy
The genus was first described by Barbara Parris in 2007 to receive some of the species of the polyphyletic genus Ctenopteris; Ctenopterella is a diminutive form of that name. She initially placed twelve species in the genus. In 2013, she described a new species, Ctenopterella gabonensis, from the Monts Doudou in Gabon, and transferred a Vietnamese species, Ctenopterella nhatrangensis, into the genus. In 2015, she transferred three more species from Ctenopteris, including one she had formerly placed in synonymy, in preparation for a monograph on the genus.

The only phylogenetic study so far to include any Ctenopterella species sampled Ctenopterella denticulata only. It found that this species, Acrosorus friderici-et-pauli (the type of its genus), and Grammitis stenophylla form a clade sister to the combined clade of Oreogrammitis, Prosaptia, Radiogrammitis, and Themelium. None of the three taxa in the first clade are particularly close morphologically. Ctenopterella denticulata has since been transferred to the genus Chrysogrammitis as Chrysogrammitis denticulata.

Species
, the Checklist of Ferns and Lycophytes of the World accepted the following species and hybrids:

Ctenopterella blechnoides (Grev.) Parris
Ctenopterella boivinii (Mett. ex Kuhn) Rakotondr. & Parris
Ctenopterella cornigera (Baker) Parris
Ctenopterella fluvialis Parris
Ctenopterella gabonensis Parris
Ctenopterella gordonii (S.B.Andrews) Parris
Ctenopterella khaoluangensis (Tagawa & K.Iwats.) Parris
Ctenopterella lasiostipes (Mett.) Parris
Ctenopterella lastii Parris & Rakotondr.
Ctenopterella lepida (Brause) Parris
Ctenopterella macrorhyncha (Baker) Parris
Ctenopterella nhatrangensis (C.Chr. & Tardieu) Parris
Ctenopterella pacifica Parris
Ctenopterella parvula (Bory ex Willd.) Parris
Ctenopterella pediculata (Baker) Parris
Ctenopterella seemannii (J.Sm.) Parris
Ctenopterella thwaitesii (Bedd.) Parris
Ctenopterella undosa (Baker) Parris
Ctenopterella vodonaivalui (Brownlie) Parris
Ctenopterella zenkeri (Hieron.) Parris

References

Polypodiaceae
Fern genera